Socialist Left ( or IS) was an electoral alliance in Peru formed by Left Socialist Accord (ASI) and the non-party socialist movement in 1989. In the 1990 presidential elections, IS launched 1985 presidential candidate Alfonso Barrantes Lingán as its candidate but lost.

1989 establishments in Peru
Defunct left-wing political party alliances
Defunct political party alliances in Peru
Political parties established in 1989
Socialist parties in Peru
Peru